Journal of Polymorphous Perversity is a satirical magazine about psychology, established and published by American psychologist Glenn Ellenbogen. Between 1984 and 2003, a total of 40 issues were published, with articles written by professionals and lay people. Ellenbogen authors some of the articles, either under his name or under the pseudonyms Ernst von Krankman (German for 'seriously from a sick person') and William Goodenough. 

There are four published collections of articles: Oral Sadism and the Vegetarian Personality (1987), The Primal Whimper (1989), Freudulent Encounters (1992), and More Oral Sadism And The Vegetarian Personality (1996).

See also
Annals of Improbable Research
Journal of Irreproducible Results

References

External links

Professional humor
Humor magazines
Magazines established in 1984
Satirical magazines published in the United States
Works about psychology